Micropanope is a genus of crabs in the family Xanthidae, containing one exclusively fossil species and the following species:

 Micropanope ashcrafti Garth, 1986
 Micropanope cristimanus Stimpson, 1871
 Micropanope lata (Faxon, 1893)
 Micropanope latimanus Stimpson, 1871
 Micropanope lobifrons A. Milne-Edwards, 1881
 Micropanope manteri Garth, 1986
 Micropanope muttingi (Rathbun, 1898)
 Micropanope pusilla A. Milne-Edwards, 1880
 Micropanope sculptipes Stimpson, 1871
 Micropanope sexlobata Rathbun, 1906
 Micropanope taylori Garth, 1986
 Micropanope truncatifrons Rathbun, 1898
 Micropanope urinator (A. Milne-Edwards, 1881)

References

Xanthoidea